The Copa del Generalísimo 1948 Final was the 46th final of the King's Cup. The final was played at Estadio Chamartín in Madrid, on 4 July 1948, being won by Sevilla CF, who beat RC Celta de Vigo 4-1.

Details

References

1948
Copa
Sevilla FC matches
RC Celta de Vigo matches